The following is a list of festivals or celebrations in the Colombian Department of La Guajira.

 Cradle of Accordions Festival
 Festival of the Laurels
 Festival of the Wayuu Culture
 Festival y Reinado Nacional del Carbón
 Festivities of Our Lady of the Remedies
 National Festival of the Dividivi

See also

Festivals in Colombia

External links
 National System for Cultural Information: Festivals in La Guajira

La Guajira
 La Guajira